Liești is the third-largest commune of Galați County, Western Moldavia, Romania on the confluence of the Siret and Bârlad rivers, very close to Tecuci (28 km) and Galați (52 km). It is composed of two villages, Liești and Șerbănești. The latter is the southernmost part of the commune.

Name
The name of the commune appears to be derived from Ilie, which means Elijah, probably a local, which seems to be the brother of Șerban, the father of Șerbănești.

History
The first mention of the village dates from 1448, when in the prince of Moldavia, Petru II, who gives as a gift to the local nobleman Cernat Ploscarul and to his brother, Ștefu, 40 villages and fields among which appear Liești and Șerbănești.

Natives
 Antonel Borșan (born 1970), sprint canoer
 Anghel Saligny (1854–1925), engineer who designed the Anghel Saligny Bridge (1895) over the Danube, the longest bridge in Europe at the time

Tourist sights
Liești has several Romanian Orthodox churches – St. Parascheva (c. 1886), Dormition of the Virgin (1889), and St. Nicholas (built after 1990)- the seat of the Protopopiate (archpriest's district) of Nicorești. Other attractions include the acacia forests near the village (especially in May) and the picturesque valleys of the rivers Siret and Bârlad.

Education
Lieşti has four schools: one which teaches until the tenth grade, and three that teach until the eighth grade. Liești also has four kindergartens and a 14,000-volume public library.

Economy
The village has a sugar factory (Lemarco Bucharest), but the majority of the population works in local agriculture or in siderurgy at the Siderurgical Combinate Mittal Steel from Galați.
Beginning around 2000, many people from the region have gone to work in Italy or Spain, where wages are higher.

Climate
The climate of Liești is Humid continental (Dfb):

References

Communes in Galați County
Localities in Western Moldavia